Chisocheton erythrocarpus is a tree in the family Meliaceae. The specific epithet  is from the Greek meaning "red-fruited".

Description
The bark is dark grey to chocolate brown. The flowers are creamy-white.

Distribution and habitat
Chisocheton erythrocarpus is found in Peninsular Malaysia, Borneo and the Philippines. The habitat is coastal forest.

References

erythrocarpus
Plants described in 1875
Trees of Peninsular Malaysia
Trees of the Philippines
Trees of Borneo